Usselby is a hamlet in the West Lindsey district of Lincolnshire, England. Usselby, a former civil parish, is part of Osgodby civil parish.

The parish church is dedicated to Saint Margaret, and is a Grade II listed building dating from the 14th century and 1749, with 1889 alterations in ironstone with red brick by Hodgson Fowler of Sheffield. Over the west door is a tablet inscribed "Queen Ann's bounty fell to this church in MDCCXLIX." The early 18th-century Queen Anne's Bounty acts of parliament provided extra income for poor incumbents.

Usselby Hall is a Grade II listed building dating from the mid-18th century with early 19th-century alterations and additions, and built with red brick. It was owned and lived in by Lord Tennyson's grandfather. During the Second World War it was used as a German Officer Prisoner of War Camp. Usselby Hall now covers most of the site of Usselby deserted medieval village.

Claxby and Usselby railway station opened here in 1848 and closed in 1960.

References

External links

Hamlets in Lincolnshire
West Lindsey District
Former civil parishes in Lincolnshire